The 2016 Pennsylvania Democratic presidential primary was held on April 26 in the U.S. state of Pennsylvania as one of the Democratic Party's primaries ahead of the 2016 presidential election.

The Democratic Party's primaries in Connecticut, Delaware, Maryland and Rhode Island were held the same day, as were Republican primaries in the same five states, including their own Pennsylvania primary. Despite winning the Pennsylvania primary, Clinton went on to lose the state to Republican candidate Donald Trump in the general election.

Opinion polling

Results

Results by county

Analysis
Clinton won a large victory over runner-up Bernie Sanders in Pennsylvania, replicating her 2008 performance against Barack Obama in the Keystone state. According to exit polls, Clinton won the white vote 51–47 (68% of the electorate), won the African American vote 70–30 (19% of the electorate), and won among women 60-39 (she lost men 50-49 to Sanders). While Sanders won among younger voters 63-37, Clinton won voters over the age of 45 66-33. Clinton swept all income and educational attainment levels except for whites without college degrees, whom Sanders won 50–49.

Clinton swept all political ideologies in the primary. She won Democrats 62-38 but lost self-identified Independents to Sanders 72–26.

Clinton also won among unions 56-43, a very important demographic in a big manufacturing state like Pennsylvania.

Clinton won large victories in all of Pennsylvania's major cities: she won in Philadelphia 63-37, the affluent Philadelphia suburbs 58-42, and also carried the cities of Pittsburgh and Erie. She won in Northeastern Pennsylvania 51-48, and in Western Pennsylvania 54-45. Sanders, for his part, did better in the rural parts of the state, winning rural voters 50–48 and carrying Central Pennsylvania 50-49. Sanders swept many of the more remote and conservative counties of the state, including parts of Amish country such as Lancaster County.

Of her victory in the Keystone State, New York Times analyst Alan Rappeport commented, "Lots of Philadelphia history and imagery coming from Clinton now. It's almost as if she has her convention speech ready."

References

Pennsylvania
Democratic primary
2016